Dr. W. W. Monroe House is a historic home located at Parkersburg, Wood County, West Virginia. It was built in 1898, and is a -story, frame dwelling on a sandstone foundation and clad in weatherboard.  The house features a large wrap-around porch, two corner turrets, a hipped roof with dormers, decorative brackets, and dentils characteristic of the Queen Anne style. It was designed by noted Charleston, West Virginia architect H. Rus Warne (1872–1954).

It was listed on the National Register of Historic Places in 2012.

References

Houses on the National Register of Historic Places in West Virginia
Queen Anne architecture in West Virginia
Houses completed in 1898
Houses in Parkersburg, West Virginia
National Register of Historic Places in Wood County, West Virginia